Harold & Kumar Go to White Castle (released in some international markets as Harold & Kumar Get the Munchies) is a 2004 American buddy stoner comedy film directed by Danny Leiner, written by Jon Hurwitz and Hayden Schlossberg, and starring John Cho, Kal Penn, and Neil Patrick Harris. The first installment in the Harold & Kumar franchise, the film follows Harold Lee (Cho) and Kumar Patel (Penn) on their adventure to a White Castle restaurant after smoking marijuana.

Hurwitz and Schlossberg developed Harold & Kumar Go to White Castle based on experiences and people from when they attended Randolph High School. The filmmakers received license permission from White Castle in 2002, after also consulting with Krispy Kreme; White Castle also contributed to the film's marketing campaign, releasing tie-in products at their restaurants. Cho and Harris (who portrays a fictionalized version of himself) were cast early, whereas Penn attended seven auditions. Principal photography began in 2003, with filming primarily done in Toronto.

Harold & Kumar Go to White Castle was theatrically released in the U.S. on July 30, 2004, by New Line Cinema. The film received positive critical reception, with praise for the performances of its leads (particularly Harris) and subversion of racial and comedic stereotypes. It was also a commercial success, grossing over $23 million worldwide. The sequel, Harold & Kumar Escape from Guantanamo Bay, was released internationally in April 2008.

Plot
Investment banker cubicle worker Harold Lee is pressured by his colleagues to do their work while they leave for the weekend. Meanwhile, his roommate Kumar Patel attends a medical school interview, where he is highly qualified but intentionally botches it to avoid getting accepted. Harold is attracted to his neighbor, Maria, but is unable to admit his feelings. After smoking marijuana and seeing an advertisement for White Castle, the pair decide to get its hamburgers. After traveling to the nearest White Castle in New Brunswick, they find it replaced by "Burger Shack". The drive-thru employee informs them of another White Castle in Cherry Hill.

Kumar suggests stopping at Princeton University to buy more marijuana. Kumar buys marijuana from one of the students and they are discovered by campus security and forced to flee, losing their marijuana. They resume their drive, and when Kumar pulls over to urinate, a raccoon gets in the car and bites Harold.  Kumar takes Harold to a hospital to check him for rabies; Harold is cleared, but Kumar's father and older brother - who work there as doctors - see them and Kumar's father confronts Kumar over his failed medical interview. Kumar fakes an apology and steals ID badges from them to obtain medical marijuana. However, Kumar is then mistaken for his brother by other doctors and is forced to perform emergency surgery on a gunshot victim. To the amazement of Harold and the nurses, Kumar effortlessly saves the patient's life in the nick of time; afterwards, the patient tells them how to reach White Castle.

Kumar spots Maria at a movie theater and decides to get her attention so Harold can talk to her, but Harold panics and crashes the car. They are rescued by Freakshow, a tow-truck driver covered with oozing boils, who takes them to his house to repair their car. Harold and Kumar are propositioned by Freakshow's surprisingly alluring wife, but after Freakshow suggests a foursome, Harold and Kumar flee in disgust. Kumar picks up a hitchhiker, Neil Patrick Harris, who is high on ecstasy. Harold and Kumar go into a convenience store to get directions and Harris drives away in their car. The duo are then harassed by a racist police officer for jaywalking. Harold attempts to punch Kumar for antagonizing the officer, but ends up punching the officer instead, resulting in his arrest.

Kumar makes a 911 call to distract the police and breaks into the station to free Harold. After Harold and Kumar flee, they encounter an escaped cheetah. After smoking marijuana with it, they decide to ride it to White Castle. Harold hits his head on a branch, destroying his laptop containing all the work that he just completed for his coworkers. Harold and a reluctant Kumar decide to not continue on their trek, but after encountering a group of extreme sports punks who have been harassing the pair, the duo change their mind and steal their truck. A state trooper spots the speeding truck and chases them. They are trapped when they reach the edge of a cliff. Spotting the White Castle below, Harold and Kumar use a hang glider from the truck to reach their destination.

The pair place their orders but are disheartened to find they have no money. Harris suddenly appears, having craved the food when hearing them talk about it and pays for their meal as an apology for stealing their car; he also further pays for "repairs". Kumar realizes he wants to be a doctor, but is afraid of conforming to the stereotype of Indians becoming doctors. Harold then notices his co-workers and two women pull up and gets angry at them because they said they had to work with clients but were actually out partying. He tells them off and threatens to get them fired if it happens again.

After returning to their apartment they encounter Maria, Harold professes his feelings for her and they kiss. She informs Harold that she is leaving for Amsterdam, but will return in ten days. When Harold tells Kumar that Maria is going to Amsterdam, Kumar convinces him to go with him to Amsterdam to pursue Maria, reminding him that marijuana is legal in the Netherlands.

Cast

Production
While living in Los Angeles, screenwriters Jon Hurwitz and Hayden Schlossberg decided to write a low-budget stoner film and base the main characters on their high school friends from Randolph High School. They based the character of Harold on their real-life friend Harold Lee. Hurwitz got the idea to base the film around White Castle from his own experience craving White Castle burgers when he lived in Pennsylvania for several years. At the time, Pennsylvania did not have any White Castle locations and Hurwitz had to have family members bring him frozen White Castle burgers from New Jersey.

The filmmakers received permission from White Castle in 2002 to use the chain's name in the film. One scene that depicted a White Castle being closed was changed at the request of the company's director of marketing. The film was also supposed to feature a hunt for Krispy Kreme donuts, but the food was changed to hamburgers when Krispy Kreme refused to allow the film to use their name.

Kal Penn revealed that he and his co-star did not get a big paycheck from the movie. They only had a gross salary of $75,000 each for the movie, but there were many deductions. Penn mentioned, "You deduct your taxes, 10% to your agent, 15% your manager, 5% to your lawyer, your publicity fees and then your rent...And it averages out to probably about five-and-a-half months of living expenses once you’ve paid everybody and paid your taxes.” He said that a working actor is likely to keep "maybe 30% of your paycheck" after paying taxes and a team of representatives, which would mean he would have been left about $22,500 from his earnings.

Casting
Hurwitz and Schlossberg included a role for Neil Patrick Harris as himself in the script without asking him first. Harris liked the script and agreed to appear in the film. They also approached John Cho and Kal Penn to try out the parts who were initially skeptical about the project. During casting, both Penn and actor Sendhil Ramamurthy were being considered for the role of Kumar. After auditioning seven times, Penn eventually won the part.

Pre-production 
The writers, Jon Hurwitz and Hayden Schlossberg, said that they were really sick of seeing teen movies that were one-dimensional and had characters who didn't look like any of their friends, who were a fairly diverse group. This prompted them to write a film that was both smart and funny and cast two guys who looked like their best friends. They had been putting Harold and Kumar who were Asian American into all of their screenplays as the main characters, but had difficulty pitching to studios. “Our logic at the time was like nobody else is writing a stoner comedy about an [East] Asian dude and an Indian dude going to get White Castle,” said Hurwitz, though director Danny Leiner remembered, “Before the casting and trying to get the money before Luke [Ryan, the executive producer] came on, we were going to a couple of the studios and one was like, “Look, we really love this movie. Why don’t we do it with a white guy and a black dude?” John Cho mentioned the writers wanted to avoid whitewashing the main leads, so they wrote ethnic specific scenes in the script. Cho recalled, “It had to be rooted in that as a defense mechanism so that they wouldn’t get turned white.” Schlossberg commented, “There had never been an Asian character without an accent except for [Cho] as the MILF guy. A lot of people read the script and just assumed they might be foreign exchange students, so you really had to emphasize that these guys were born in America. It was a totally different world.”

Kal Penn stated that the reason the movie was greenlit was because there were two junior execs at New Line Cinema who were given this new project and decided to take a chance on it. Penn explained, "The older people around Hollywood, the older people in town were like, ‘We don't know if America is ready for two Asian American men as leads in a comedy.'"

A few days before shooting the movie, Cho knocked on Penn’s door and told him, “If we’re supposed to be best friends, we’d better start hanging out together.” They went to get a beer together and under artificial conditions, began a real friendship.

Filming
Harold & Kumar began filming on May 12, 2003. The film is set in New Jersey, but was mainly filmed in Toronto, Ontario, Canada. Scenes set at Princeton University were actually filmed at the University of Toronto's Victoria College and Knox College. The production design team had to build a White Castle franchise especially for the shoot since Canada does not have White Castle restaurants. During filming, Penn ate veggie burgers as he is a vegetarian.

Soundtrack

Harold & Kumar Go to White Castle: Original Soundtrack was released on July 27, 2004. It contains 16 songs from the film.

Track list
 "Chick Magnet" – MxPx
 "One Good Spliff" – Ziggy Marley / The Melody Makers
 "Yeah (Dream of Me)" – All Too Much
 "Righteous Dub" – Long Beach Dub All Stars
 "Skunk One" – Kottonmouth Kings
 "Same Old Song" – Phunk Junkeez
 "White Castle Blues" – The Smithereens
 "Crazy On You" – Heart
 "Cameltoe" – Fannypack
 "Kinda High, Kinda Drunk" – Coolio
 "Mary Jane" – Rick James
 "I Wanna Get Next to You" – Rose Royce
 "Hold On" – Wilson Phillips
 "Ridin'" – Classic & 86
 "Arrival at White Castle" – Heiruspecs
 "Total Eclipse of the Heart" – Nicki French

Songs that are in the film but do not appear on the soundtrack include:
 "Also Sprach Zarathustra" – David Kitay, Richard Strauss
 "Baby Baby" – Amy Grant
 "Ballin' Boy" – No Good
 "Click Click Pow" – Lexicon (real song title is "The Official")
 "Warrior Dance" – Zion I feat. Pep Love
 "Fall In Line" – Phunk Junkeez
 "Faraway" – Dara Schindler
 "Gangsta Gangsta" – J. O'Neal / D. Black
 "Girl From Ypsilanti" – Daniel May
 "Let's Get Retarded" – Black Eyed Peas (this song is the unedited version of their "Let's Get It Started" hit)
 "Looney" – Moonshine Bandits
 "Mariachi Speier" – Eric Speier
 "On the Ganges" – Matt Hirt
 "Rock to the Rhythm" – Lexicon (actual song name is "Rock")
 "Rock Your Body 2004" – Stagga Lee
 "Ooh Wee" – Mark Ronson

Release

Marketing
In the 11 days before the film's release, New Line Cinema turned a parking lot on Sunset Strip into a temporary White Castle. The restaurant served 40,000 burgers to patrons, including Quentin Tarantino, Farrah Fawcett and Jay Leno.

White Castle launched several promotions in tandem with the film's release. The restaurant chain featured beverage cups with pictures of Harold and Kumar. They also provided free hamburgers to moviegoers attending the film's premiere. Cho and Penn were inducted into the company's White Castle Cravers Hall of Fame in 2004.

Box office
In its opening weekend, the film grossed $5,480,378 in 2,135 theatres in the United States and Canada. In total it had a worldwide gross of $23,936,908.

Critical reception
The film was positively received by critics, with a 74% rating at Rotten Tomatoes based on 148 reviews; the consensus states, "The likable leads and subversion of racial stereotypes elevate Harold and Kumar above the typical stoner comedy."

Film critic Roger Ebert of the Chicago Sun-Times awarded the film 3 out of 4 stars and wrote "One secret of fiction is the creation of unique characters who are precisely defined. The secret of comedy is the same, with the difference being that the characters must be obsessed with unwholesome but understandable human desires."

Home media
The "Extreme Unrated" edition of the DVD was released on January 4, 2005. It includes special features like a mockumentary, "The Art of the Fart", "The Backseat Interview", an interview with Cho and Penn, and a making-of featurette about the Land of Burgers animated segment. The DVD also features two commentaries: one by writers Jon Hurwitz and Hayden Schlossberg and one by actor Dan Bochart in character as Extreme Sports Punk #1. The film was re-released on DVD in 2007 and a remastered edition was released in 2008. The film was released on Blu-ray on November 13, 2012.

As of August 17, 2008, the film had 2,878,770 DVD sales in the United States, grossing $30,609,751.

Sequels
Harold & Kumar Escape from Guantanamo Bay is the 2008 sequel to White Castle. The movie revolves around Harold and Kumar trying to get to Amsterdam to find Maria, but when the two are mistaken for terrorists on the plane, they are sent to the Guantanamo Bay detention camp.

Both Hurwitz and Schlossberg announced plans to write a third Harold and Kumar film, with Greg Shapiro returning as producer, and Kal Penn and John Cho returning in their title roles, while Todd Strauss-Schulson directed the film. A Very Harold & Kumar 3D Christmas, was released on November 4, 2011 in 2D and 3D.

References

External links

 
 
 
 
 

2004 films
2000s buddy comedy films
2000s adventure comedy films
2000s comedy road movies
American adventure comedy films
American buddy comedy films
American satirical films
American films about cannabis
American comedy road movies
2000s English-language films
Films about race and ethnicity
Films directed by Danny Leiner
Films scored by David Kitay
Films set in New Jersey
Films shot in New Jersey
Films shot in Toronto
New Line Cinema films
2000s satirical films
White Castle (restaurant)
Stoner films
Comedy films about Asian Americans
Films about Korean Americans
2004 comedy films
2000s American films